Switching Goals is a 1999 television film directed by David Steinberg and starring Mary-Kate and Ashley Olsen.

Plot
Thirteen-year-old twin sisters Sam and Emma Stanton are opposites growing up in Evansville. Sam is a star soccer player and a tomboy; however, she wants to attract boys. Emma is a popular girly girl who enjoys fashion and make-up, but she wants to be better at sports. Their dad Jerry, one of the Soccer coaches, is pressured by his wife Denise to pick Emma for the Hurricanes co-ed team. Just as Jerry is about to pick Sam for his team after Round 2 of Soccer Tryouts is over, the Buzzards coach Willard Holmes picks Sam. But Sam is not thrilled to join a team which hasn't won in years and Emma finds it difficult to please her dad so the girls come up with a scheme to switch places in soccer so each can be on the team they prefer. As a result, Sam learns about letting others share the spotlight and Emma and Jerry finally become closer. Their mom catches them and the girls have to go back to their original teams. When everyone else is mad at them Sam and Emma both decide to quit soccer, but Jerry refuses to let them give up the sport. Denise becomes the Buzzards new coach to prove her husband wrong and actually gets the team into the finals. Along the way Emma realizes her skill as a goalie and becomes a better athlete. At the finals the Hurricanes regular goalie Richie gets injured while blocking a kick and is replaced by Emma. At 20 seconds left Sam kicks the ball into the goal, and it is blocked by Emma, tying the game. The Buzzards and the Hurricanes become co-champions of the Youth soccer league organization tournament. Sam gets a date with Greg. Richie goes on a date with Emma. Jerry learns to treat his daughters equally and that winning isn't everything.

Cast 
 Ashley Olsen as Emma Stanton
 Mary-Kate Olsen as Sam Stanton
 Kathryn Greenwood as Dr. Denise Stanton
 Eric Lutes as Coach Jerry Stanton
 Joe Grifasi as Dave
 Trevor Blumas as Greg Jeffries
 Keith Knight as Coach Willard Holmes
 Jake LeDoux as Richie
 Calvin Rosemond as Frankie
 Michael Cera as Taylor
 Robert Clark as Robert "Helmet Head"
 Brian Heighton as Jim
 Ted Atherton as Mitch
 Vito Rezza as Sal
 Damir Andrei as Arden
 Michael Lamport as Adrian
 Jesse Farb as Oscar
 Marcello Melecca as Danny
 Judah Katz as Mike
 Joseph Yawson as Sean Mark
 Moynan King as Taylor's mom
 Joanna Reece as Bobby's mom
 Wendy Haller as Teacher
 Adrian Griffin as Referee
 Alex House as Kid at arcade
 Alexi Lalas as Himself

References

External links

 United Soccer Leagues

1999 television films
1999 films
American television films
Warner Bros. direct-to-video films
Films about twin sisters
2000s English-language films
Films set in Illinois
Women's association football films
Twins in fiction
Films scored by Patrick Williams
Films shot in Toronto
1999 direct-to-video films
American direct-to-video films